Chansons pour les mois d'hiver is francophone Canadian pop singer Isabelle Boulay's seventh studio album, released in November 2009.  It was certified gold in January 2010 as a result of selling 40,000 copies.

Track listing

 "Feignez de dormir" — 2:36
 "Chanson pour les mois d'hiver" — 4:14
 "L'amitié" — 2:37
 "Hors-saison" — 3:56
 "Le patineur" — 3:04
 "La ballade du chien-loup" — 6:34
 "Je reviens chez vous" — 3:37
 "Déranger les pierres" — 3:16
 "Tennessee Waltz" — 2:47
 "Shefferville, le dernier train" — 5:41
 "Marie-Noël" —  3:07

Certifications

Charts

Weekly charts

Year-end charts

References

2009 albums
Isabelle Boulay albums